In the Wee Small Hours is the ninth studio album by American vocalist Frank Sinatra. It was released in April 1955 by Capitol and produced by Voyle Gilmore with arrangements by Nelson Riddle. All the songs on the album deal with themes such as loneliness, introspection, melancholy, desolation, lost love, failed relationships, depression, and night life. The cover artwork reflects these themes, portraying Sinatra alone on an eerie and deserted city street at night awash in blue-tinged street lights. In the Wee Small Hours has been called one of the first concept albums.

Sinatra had been developing the idea of an album with a consistent theme since 1946 with his first album, The Voice. He would successfully continue releasing "concept" albums with later releases such as Songs for Swingin' Lovers!, Where Are You?, Only the Lonely and No One Cares.

In the Wee Small Hours was issued as two 10-inch LP discs, and also as one 12-inch record LP, making it one of the first of its kind in the pop field. It was also issued as four four–song 45-rpm EP discs sold in cardboard sleeves with the same cover as the LPs, not in paper covers like 45-rpm singles.

The album was a commercial success, peaking at number two on the US Billboard 200 chart, where it stayed for 18 weeks, becoming Sinatra's highest charting album since Songs by Sinatra in 1947. The success of the album helped popularize the viability of the 12-inch LP in popular music, and the 10-inch format fell into obsolescence by the end of the 1950s. In 1970 it was re-issued as a ten track album under the name What Is This Thing Called Love?.

In 2003, Rolling Stone ranked it number 100 on their list of The 500 Greatest Albums of All Time, dropping it to number 101 in the 2012 revision and to number 282 in the 2020 update.

Background
By the early 1950s, the singer saw his career in decline, his teen "bobby soxer" audience having lost interest in him as he entered his late 30s. In 1951, he went so far as to attempt suicide, according to one author. Later that year, a second season of The Frank Sinatra Show was aired on CBS, but failed to receive the same positive reception the first season had, with its host having lost his previous energy. Later, Sinatra was dropped from Columbia.

Against the wishes of his colleagues, on March 14, 1953, vice president of A&R at Capitol Alan Livingston signed Sinatra to a seven-year deal. The deal proved to be a success; later that year in August, Sinatra appeared as Private Angelo Maggio in the film From Here to Eternity. The film was successful and his performance was acclaimed, winning the Academy Award for Best Supporting Actor and the Golden Globe Award for Best Supporting Actor. With this new popularity he recorded two 10” LP albums, Songs for Young Lovers and Swing Easy!, which both peaked at number three on the Billboard album chart, with the latter reaching number five on the UK Album Charts. His performance as the lead character in The Man with the Golden Arm earned him nominations for Best Actor at the Academy Awards and the BAFTA awards.

Relationship troubles

By the time he recorded In the Wee Small Hours, Sinatra witnessed the end of several relationships. He and his first wife, Nancy Barbato, separated on Valentine's Day 1950. While still married, he began a relationship with Ava Gardner. After he and Barbato divorced in October 1951, he married Gardner ten days later. But they were both jealous of the other's extramarital affairs. The relationship deteriorated during the recording of Songs for Young Lovers.

Despite considerable influence in getting him a part in From Here to Eternity, Gardner left Sinatra two months after the release of the film, divorcing in 1957. She said, "We don't have the ability to live together like any normal married couple." It is assumed that this album's grouping of "love gone bad" songs, and Sinatra's poignant renderings, were a direct result of Sinatra's failing relationship with Gardner, to the point that these are called "Ava Songs".

Riddle credited Sinatra's loss of Gardner with his ability to sing the type of songs contained in this album. The failure of this relationship did not shatter Sinatra but instead caused him to sing more emotionally. In the midst of these personal disturbances, Sinatra began selecting songs for a new album. He would rehearse each one of them reiteratively at home with Bill Miller, his pianist.

Recording
The album was designed as a concept album. Albums from the time period tended to be little more than collections of singles, but Sinatra developed a distinction between songs intended as singles for radio airplay and for jukeboxes, and those songs he intended to package together in an album. His sessions intended for album release tend to be more serious, artistically.

In the Wee Small Hours was recorded before stereophonic technology, but the fidelity of this monophonic album feels "warm" to modern ears. The album was recorded in five sessions at KHJ Studios, Hollywood. These sessions took place on February 8, 16, and 17, and April 1 and 4, and would start at 8:00 P.M., continuing to past midnight. The sessions were recorded in Studio C, located downstairs, which was a smaller studio designed to record small ensembles. The first four songs recorded specifically for this album ("Can't We Be Friends", "Dancing on the Ceiling", "Glad to Be Unhappy", "I'll Be Around") were not recorded with any brass or strings, but were sparsely arranged. Although the arrangements were Riddle's, there was no need for a conductor, so pianist Bill Miller managed from his instrument.

Set against his then-current relationship troubles, Sinatra set out to record "angst-ridden" songs involving lost love. Sinatra was very tense during the recording of the album, reportedly breaking down and crying after the master take of "When Your Lover Has Gone". Rita Kirwan of Music magazine witnessed one of the sessions, and her account goes thus:

Nelson Riddle commented on Sinatra's work ethic and its effect on Riddle's arrangements and the studio orchestra:

Sinatra was meticulous about the quality of the sessions for In the Wee Small Hours. Guitarist George Van Eps recalls that Sinatra stopped a session after only singing a few notes because he felt his voice did not have "the right sound" at the time. The session was rescheduled for the following night, and Van Eps felt it "was perfect." Sinatra also carefully sequenced the songs, with input from Miller and Riddle, for the LP he personally referred to as "the Ava album."

Sinatra's voice was maturing at this point, and he had matured musically regarding intonation and vocal shading. He had also become more comfortable with improvising rhythmically within the confines of Riddle's arrangements. Slight technical imperfections by Sinatra have been found in this recording, but the overall emotional effect compensates completely, so that the listener attributes any shortcomings to the sincere human expressions of the singer.

Songs
With the exception of the title track, the songs are from the Great American Songbook. "Can't We Be Friends?" opens with a set of chords on minimalist guitar. Sinatra's interpretation runs from placid to profligate. "Dancing on the Ceiling" is among the songs recorded with only a small group. It is a rarity among Riddle arrangements; he rarely created scores for small jazz ensembles.

"Deep in a Dream" is identified by critic Will Friedwald as an example of Sinatra's ability to interpret songs in that the song could easily be delivered as "detached" or "hysterical", but Sinatra finds the perfect balance. The song was considered for inclusion in Trilogy: Past Present Future but did not make the final cut. "Glad to Be Unhappy" was a forgotten song until Sinatra brought it into popular consciousness. In this album it receives small-group jazz treatment.

"I Get Along Without You Very Well" is an "exquisitely ironic" piece written by Hoagy Carmichael with lyrics based on a poem by Jane Brown Thompson. Although Sinatra's relationship with Gardner ended badly, author James Kaplan suggests this song set the album's mood of "capitulation, not retaliation". "I See Your Face Before Me" was Nelson Riddle's favorite and was the first song he arranged: he created a setting for it while at Ridgefield High School. The arrangement for "I'll Be Around" is a musical pun in that the celesta plays a circular riff. "I'll Never Be the Same" uses a "wind chime" motif, which came from Riddle's appreciation of French impressionist music. He uses this same mini-theme briefly in "It Never Entered My Mind" and in "Gone With the Wind" from the 1958 album Frank Sinatra Sings for Only the Lonely. "Ill Wind" features extended jazz solos by Harry Edison and Skeets Herfurt.

The title track came about by happenstance. Composers Bob Hilliard and David Mann were in New York City to visit a publisher. They spotted Sinatra and Riddle and decided to show them their new composition "In the Wee Small Hours of the Morning." Sinatra liked the song and wanted to use it immediately. Sinatra recorded "It Never Entered My Mind" in 1947 for Columbia. It was part of the Rodgers and Hart Broadway show Higher and Higher. Ironically, this song, which was a long-time resident in Sinatra's repertoire, was cut from the film version, Sinatra's cinematic debut.

Recorded nearly a year before all other selections, "Last Night When We Were Young" was difficult, according to Riddle, because about thirty takes were used. The recording uses a "low-key" coda, emphasizing strings and horns, and a brief guitar solo. Sinatra was involved in the production and felt that the guitar solo needed to be slowed considerably. He held Riddle and the musicians in high esteem, so he talked with guitarist George Van Eps about the change, then discussed it separately with Riddle. Van Eps commented, "Frank was loaded with things like that." The finale is a "cataclysmic climax." Sinatra recorded the song with an arrangement by Gordon Jenkins for the album September of My Years (1965). Last Night was written for the movie Metropolitan (1935) but was cut from the final version, appearing only as an instrumental during the credits. The song includes advanced harmonic progressions and a juxtaposition of chromaticism and octave leaps.

In addition to "Ill Wind", "Mood Indigo" by Duke Ellington is the purest jazz song on the album. A motif developed by Riddle became the descending riff in Sinatra's hit "Witchcraft". Sinatra would include a blues-based selection such as this on each of his "downbeat" albums.

"This Love of Mine" was recorded by Sinatra in 1941 when he was with the Tommy Dorsey orchestra. In this 1955 version Sinatra gives a more mature reading to the lyrics. Riddle brings a rich arrangement to the harmonically simple song, which assists the mood presented in the album. "What Is This Thing Called Love" is noted by Charles Granata for its "most expressive vocal shading". Sinatra's voice approaches the bass range at times, and the interpretation is noted for the lyrical liberties Sinatra takes with Porter's lyrics. The song was recorded in 21 takes. "When Your Lover Has Gone" had a great effect on Lester Young. Young asked record store clerk Bob Sherrick to "Let me hear something by my man, Frank." In the Wee Small Hours had been recently released, and Sherrick played this song for Young. Young left the record shop muttering to himself that he had to record it himself on his next session.

Artwork
The cover art is designed to set the mood for the music. The cover shows Sinatra on an eerie and deserted street awash in blue-tinged street lights, reflecting the album's themes of introspection, lost love, failed relationships, depression, and night life. It is significant that Sinatra is depicted alone, as loneliness during the "Wee Small Hours" is a theme of the album. Rather than at a rakish angle, Sinatra's snap-brim hat is pushed back, suggesting resignation and openness. The artwork is reminiscent of film noir or a hardboiled fiction cover.

Themes
Themes of loss and love's bittersweet relationship to loss pervade the album. Yet the ending tone is not one of despair, but of hope and survival as made possible by cathartic reflection. Perhaps given as kindly advice by a person of experience, Jonathan Schwartz believes the album refrains from being "mushy" but instead presents the material in a stately manner. Sinatra's next album, Songs for Swingin' Lovers, seems to follow up on this promise by depicting an individual who is "free to enjoy women again". These two albums well represent the "heartbroken/hedonistic duality" of Sinatra's persona in the mid-1950s.

Releases
Sinatra intended the album to be his first 12-inch LP, but it was initially released as a two-volume set, each set containing eight songs, as a set of 2 ten-inch LPs (Capitol H-581 PT1 and PT2) and as a set of 2 45rpm EP sets, each of 2 discs. The album was released in April 1955. Taken as a whole, the collection is Sinatra's first truly full-length album. Capitol record executives were concerned that an entire album of "dark" material would disaffect the record-buying public. It peaked at number 2 on the Billboard 200, where it remained for 18 weeks, the longest time Sinatra had held a spot in the top-ten at the time, and also his highest charting album since Songs by Sinatra. On September 6, 2002, it was certified Gold by the RIAA, meaning it had shifted over 500,000 units.

In 1992, the label reissued the CD with all 16 tracks. In 1998 the album was remastered using 20-bit technology under Larry Walsh's supervision at Capitol Recording Studios. Since 1998, recognizing Sinatra's enduring worldwide popularity, In the Wee Small Hours has been reissued several times on vinyl, compact disc, and digital download.

Reception

Popular reception
The album was popular on its release. In the United States the album was listed at number two at its peak and appeared on the charts for eighteen weeks. In August 1962 it re-entered the Billboard album charts.

Critical reception

Since its release, In the Wee Small Hours has been regarded as one of Sinatra's best, often ranked with Songs for Swingin' Lovers! (1956) and Frank Sinatra Sings for Only the Lonely (1958). It is also considered by many to be one of the best vocal jazz releases of all time. It received immediate critical acclaim on its release. Acclaimed Music, a website which aggregates musical accolades, names ...Hours the 3rd most acclaimed album of the 1950s (...Swingin' Lovers! being one place behind it), with only Kind of Blue by Miles Davis and Elvis Presley's self-titled début album in front. It also names the album the 322nd-most-acclaimed album of all time.

In 2000, it was voted number 359 in Colin Larkin's All Time Top 1000 Albums.

Stephen Thomas Erlewine commented in AllMusic that the album had an authentic melancholy mood, and is "one of Sinatra's most jazz-oriented performances". Another critic called the album "...perhaps the definitive musical evocation of loneliness".

Writing for The New Yorker, Andy Friedman credits In the Wee Small Hours with changing the purpose of an LP from a mere collection of singles into an art form capable of high literature.

Jazz historian Scott Yanow described the album as "Sinatra often mourning lost love and sounding a bit desolate but ultimately hopeful."

Accolades

Legacy
The album marks a turning point for Sinatra, the beginning of Sinatra's "mature" singing style, carrying with it both depth of emotive expression and willingness to experiment rhythmically. Sinatra's relationship with Gardner had previously largely been unaccepted by the general public. John Rockwell believes it was this album, because of the genuine emotional palette on display, that changed the perception of the "validity" of the ill-fated romance.

Charles Granata opines that this album of ballads best defines Sinatra and the era in which it was recorded. Based largely on Sinatra's reputation, this album helped change the "tough guy" image, allowing for a larger range of acceptable emotional responses from men, which might previously have been perceived as for wimps. Directly before Sinatra's funeral service, songs from "the Ava album" were played by a trio led by Bill Miller.

The title track, "In the Wee Small Hours of the Morning", has been recorded by a number of artists following Sinatra's version, including Johnny Hartman, Astrud Gilberto, Lou Rawls, Carly Simon, Art Blakey, Count Basie and His Orchestra, Andy Williams, Wes Montgomery, Ruby Braff, Jamie Cullum, John Mayer, Susan Wong, Curtis Stigers (on his 2009 album Lost in Dreams) and many others.

In his autobiography, B.B. King speaks about how he was a "Sinatra nut" and how he went to bed every night listening to In the Wee Small Hours. In Marvin Gaye's biography Divided Soul, the album is cited as a favorite and an inspiration for his posthumously released "ballad" album Vulnerable along with Billie Holiday's Lady in Satin. Claus Ogerman considered In the Wee Small Hours to be "the pinnacle of everything in pop music."

Cover artwork 
In the Wee Small Hours' cover artwork has been subject to many interpretations and homages over the years.

Andy Williams' 1959 album Lonely Street features Williams posing for the cover art of his album in a similar fashion as Sinatra did for In the Wee Small Hours; the release also features a recording of Williams performing "In the Wee Small Hours of the Morning". Tom Waits has named In the Wee Small Hours one of his favourite albums. His second album, The Heart of Saturday Night, released in 1974, features a cover artwork painted by Lynn Lascaro that is based on In the Wee Small Hours'. When Harry Nilsson's 1973 album A Little Touch of Schmilsson in the Night was reissued in 1988, its title was updated to A Touch More Schmilsson in the Night and a new cover artwork was painted by Steve Russell, based on In the Wee Small Hours'.

The New Bomb Turks' 1993 split 7-inch vinyl with Sinister Six features a black and white photo manipulation of In the Wee Small Hours' original album artwork. Subsonics' 1993 album Good Violence features a new interpretation of In the Wee Small Hours' cover art, painted by band members Buffi Aguero and Ronald Skutt, but with Sinatra holding a syringe instead of a cigarette.

In the Wee Small Hours' album cover appears in the 2001 Cameron Crowe film Vanilla Sky during the final scene when Tom Cruise's character David Aames jumps off a building and sees his life flashing by. Kurt Elling's 2007 album Nightmoves' cover art features Elling posing for a photograph with the same pose as Sinatra did on In the Wee Small Hours; the release also features a recording of Elling performing "In the Wee Small Hours of the Morning". Ogham Waite and The Amphibian Jazz Band's 2011 live album Live at the Gilman House features a cover art painted by Darrell Tutchton that is based on In the Wee Small Hours'.

Canadian-American melogaze band Vision Eternel also based the cover artwork of their 2020 concept extended play For Farewell Of Nostalgia on In the Wee Small Hours', this one features an illustration by American painter Michael Koelsch. Willie Nelson's 2021 release That's Life has a cover art painted by Paul Mann that is again based on In the Wee Small Hours.

Track listing

Complete personnel
 Frank Sinatra – vocals
 Nelson Riddle – arranger, conductor
 Voyle Gilmore – producer
 John Palladino – audio engineer

See also 
 Album era
 List of songs introduced by Frank Sinatra

References

1955 albums
Capitol Records albums
Concept albums
Frank Sinatra albums
Albums arranged by Nelson Riddle
Albums conducted by Nelson Riddle
Albums produced by Voyle Gilmore
Grammy Hall of Fame Award recipients